is a Japanese actress.

Filmography

Films

Television

References 

1984 births
Living people
Japanese actresses
Asadora lead actors